Sa'duddin (2 June 1961 – 16 May 2021) was an Indonesian politician and a member of the Islam-based Prosperous Justice Party (PKS).

Political career
Sa'duddin was Regent of Bekasi from 2007 to 2012. During his term, he oversaw the elimination of tuition fees for students at state-run elementary and junior high schools.

In 2012, he stood for re-election with Jamal Lulail as his running mate, but lost to Golkar Party candidate Neneng Hasanah Yasin and her running mate Rohim Mintareja. Sa'duddin accused the winning candidate of practicing money politics and challenged the election result, but the Constitutional Court upheld Neneng's victory.

In 2014, Sa'duddin was elected a member of the House of Representatives for the 2014-2019 period, as a representative of PKS. He then became a member of House Commission II on home affairs, but in April 2016 switched to House Commission IV on agriculture, fisheries and food. He resigned from the national parliament later in 2016, so he could run again for the position of Bekasi regent.

In 2017, he stood for election as Bekasi regent, this time with musician Ahmad Dhani as his running mate, but they came second with 24.84% of the vote.

Death
Sa'duddin died on 16 May 2021 at Hermina Hospital in Depok after suffering a lung disease.

References

1961 births
2021 deaths
Indonesian politicians
Mayors and regents of places in West Java
Prosperous Justice Party politicians
People from Bekasi